Volvarina insulana is a species of small to very small sea snail, a marine gastropod mollusc in the family Marginellidae, the margin shells.

Distribution
This species is endemic to São Tomé and Príncipe.

References

Marginellidae
Endemic fauna of São Tomé and Príncipe
Invertebrates of São Tomé and Príncipe
Gastropods described in 1988
Taxonomy articles created by Polbot